Chtonobdella limbata is a species of blood sucking leech, found in New South Wales, Australia; it belongs to the genus Chtonobdella and may be called the Australian bush leech. This species was described in 1866 by the German naturalist Adolph Eduard Grube. A variant name, Gnathobdellida limbata, sometimes appears in the literature.

Bite 
Generally the bite is harmless. There will be bleeding, and possible irritation and itching after the bite. There is no evidence that the leech can transmit disease. However, some people have an allergic reaction or infection.

References 

Leeches
Taxa named by Adolph Eduard Grube